Gabrška Gora is a settlement in the Municipality of Škofja Loka in the Upper Carniola region of Slovenia.

Church

The local church on a hill above the settlement is dedicated to Saints Primus and Felician. It has 13th-century Romanesque origins, but was rebuilt several times. The main altar is from 1911 with two side altars from the early 19th and 20th centuries. Its bell dates from 1719.

References

External links 

Gabrška Gora at Geopedia

Populated places in the Municipality of Škofja Loka